The slender-billed scimitar babbler (Pomatorhinus superciliaris) is a passerine bird in the Old World babbler family. It is found from the Himalayas to north-western Vietnam. Its natural habitat is subtropical or tropical moist montane forests.

The slender-billed scimitar babbler was formerly placed in the monotypic genus Xiphirhynchus. It was moved to Pomatorhinus based on the results of a molecular phylogenetic study of the babblers published in 2009 that showed that it nested within a clade with other members of Pomatorhinus.

References

 BirdLife International 2004.  Xiphirhynchus superciliaris.   2006 IUCN Red List of Threatened Species.   Downloaded on 27 July 2007.
Collar, N. J. & Robson, C. 2007. Family Timaliidae (Babblers)  pp. 70 – 291 in; del Hoyo, J., Elliott, A. & Christie, D.A. eds. Handbook of the Birds of the World, Vol. 12. Picathartes to Tits and Chickadees. Lynx Edicions, Barcelona.

slender-billed scimitar babbler
Birds of Eastern Himalaya
Birds of Myanmar
slender-billed scimitar babbler
slender-billed scimitar babbler
Taxonomy articles created by Polbot